Festival of Trees is the name taken by a number of (apparently independent) charity events/organizations that hold annual events around Christmas time to raise money for some local charity many for children hospitals and other organizations  (often, but not always, a hospital or more specifically, a children's hospital). These events seem to be becoming more common in North America as of this writing and are centered on the decoration and display of Christmas trees.

The general outline of the event is as follows, although details may vary from location to location.
 Sponsors are obtained who agree to cover costs of advertising, hiring a hall or convention center, obtaining undecorated trees (or wreaths or other traditional holiday decorations) or the cost of a particular tree's decorations, producing a program, or covering other costs.
 Designers are engaged to decorate/design the trees. Often elaborate theming is employed. Sometimes clubs, schools or other organizations participate as well as professional designers.
 The hall is opened to the designers or organizations who decorate and arrange the trees.
 The hall is opened to the general public, often for an admission charge. The public may be able to bid or buy raffle tickets for the trees or other decorations, or for prizes also donated. (typically one of the event goals is to sell every tree that is on display)
 At some point there may be a black tie gala for contributors or supporters. Presentations about the charity supported are often made.
 The event usually gets much local media attention before and during the public visitation period
 There may be other attractions such as children's play areas, craft areas, visits with Santa and so forth
 The event winds down and the purchasers of the trees pick them up or make arrange for delivery

Depending on the size of the municipality where the Festival of Trees is held, there may be several hundred trees of all sizes on display, and the amounts raised can be in the millions of USD.

See also
Riverside, California - Festivals & Events

References

External links

 Google search for organizations holding or sponsoring such a festival. at least 20 different cities can be found in this list that have recently had these festivals.
Some Examples (not intended to be exhaustive, merely illustrative of the sort of event):
 Atlanta, Georgia, USA area   in 2005
 Detroit, Michigan, USA area  in 2005, first held in 1985
 Oak Park - River Forest, USA area  in 2009, Lee Latham, Executive Director, Werner Huget, Executive Board.  2013 Held by the Oak Park - River Forest Chamber of Commerce. 2013 Event [to be] Held At Holley Court Terrace, Oak Park, Illinois
 Providence, Rhode Island, USA area
 Riverside, California, USA, first held in 1990.
 Salt Lake City, Utah - Grandma of all Festivals of Trees, since 1970, held at the Calvin Rampton Salt Palace Convention Center until 2000, at Sandy, Utah's South Towne Exposition Center since then. At least 800 trees plus gingerbread houses, playhouses, sweets, etc., covering  area.
 Seattle, Washington, USA area
 Vancouver, British Columbia, Canada area
 Davenport, Iowa - raises funds for Quad City Arts, a non-profit arts organization serving the region. Quad City Arts' Festival of Trees is more than 20 years old and includes a Macy-style helium balloon parade.
 Knoxville, Tennessee, USA area  first held in 1986. Though named differently as Fantasy of Trees it is in the same line of annual event and benefits East Tennessee Children's Hospital.
 Eugene, Oregon, USA area Cascade Health Solutions Festival of Trees. Sponsors different community medical needs each year. 2015 marked the 23rd annual Cascade Health Solutions Festival of Trees, and this year sponsored construction of the Pete Moore Hospice House.
Orinda, California, Orinda Woman's Club's Festival of Trees

Christmas festivals
Winter traditions